Nalamada Uttam Kumar Reddy (born 20 June 1962) is a politician and former Indian Air Force pilot from the Indian state of Telangana. He is a Member of Parliament (MP) for the Nalgonda constituency. He served as Member of the Legislative Assembly (MLA) from Kodad between 1999 and 2009 and from Huzurnagar between 2009 and 2019. He served as the president of Telangana Pradesh Congress Committee from February 2015 until June 2021. He served as the Minister of Housing, Weaker Selection Housing Programmes in N. Kiran Kumar Reddy's ministry.

Early life
Uttam Kumar Reddy was born on 20 June 1962 in Nalgonda district, Andhra Pradesh to Purushottam Reddy and Usha Devi. He is a graduate in B.Sc. He is a former fighter pilot in the Indian Air Force. He flew the MiG 21 and MiG 23 in front line fighter squadrons. He served as the Controller of Security, Protocol, Administration, Foreign trips of President at Rashtrapati Bhavan.

Political career
Uttam Kumar Reddy is a five-time MLA from Congress. He won the 1999 elections from Kodad constituency. He won from the same constituency in 2004 elections. In 2009, he shifted to Huzurnagar constituency and won the 2009, 2014 elections. After the formation of Telangana, he contested and won the 2018 elections from Huzurnagar. In the 2019 general elections, he contested and won as an MP from Nalgonda constituency. After winning as an MP, he resigned as an MLA from Huzurnagar that he won in 2018, with effect from 5 June. He served as the Minister of Housing, Weaker Sections Housing Programmes in N. Kiran Kumar Reddy's ministry.

He represented the Telangana region in an all party meeting held by the then Union Home Minister P. Chidambaram in January 2011 to discuss the Srikrishna Committee report.

He served as the official president of Telangana Pradesh Congress Committee (TPCC) from March 2015 until June 2021. After the defeat of Congress party in 2020 GHMC elections, he resigned as the TPCC president. However, the party continued with him until he was replaced by Revanth Reddy in June 2021.

Other works
Uttam Kumar Reddy played the role of a chief minister in the movie Terror (2016).

Personal life
Uttam Kumar Reddy is married to N. Padmavathi Reddy. The couple has no children.

References

Living people
1962 births
People from Nalgonda district
People from Suryapet district
Andhra Pradesh MLAs 1999–2004
Andhra Pradesh MLAs 2004–2009
Andhra Pradesh MLAs 2009–2014
Telangana MLAs 2014–2018
Telangana MLAs 2018–2023
India MPs 2019–present
Indian National Congress politicians from Andhra Pradesh
Indian National Congress politicians from Telangana